Botanical illustration is the art of depicting the form, color, and details of plant species.  They are generally meant to be scientifically descriptive about subjects depicted and are often found printed alongside a botanical description in books, magazines, and other media. Some are sold as artworks. Often composed by a botanical illustrator in consultation with a scientific author, their creation requires an understanding of plant morphology and access to specimens and references.

Many illustrations are in watercolour, but may also be in oils, ink,  or pencil, or a combination of these and other media. The image may be life-size or not, though at times a scale is shown, and may show the life cycle and/or habitat of the plant and its neighbors, the upper and reverse sides of leaves, and details of flowers, bud, seed and root system.

Botanical illustration is sometimes used as a type for attribution of a botanical name to a taxon. The fragility of dried or otherwise preserved specimens, or restrictions on transport, have made illustrations viable alternative visual references for taxonomists. Many minute plants or botanic specimens, which may only be visible under a microscope, are often identified by an illustration to overcome the difficulties in submitting slide-mounted type specimens. The standards for this are by international agreement (Art 37.5 of the Vienna Code, 2006).

History

Early herbals and pharmacopoeia of many cultures include illustrations of plants. Botanical illustrations in such texts were often created to assist with identification of a specie for some medicinal purpose. The earliest surviving illustrated botanical work is the Codex vindobonensis. It is a copy of Dioscorides's De Materia Medica, and was made in the year 512 for Juliana Anicia, daughter of the former Western Roman Emperor Olybrius. The problem of accurately describing plants between regions and languages, before the introduction of taxonomy, was potentially hazardous to medicinal preparations. The low quality of printing of early works sometimes presents difficulties in identifying the species depicted.

When botanical nomenclature began to be systematized and texts on taxonomic classifications were regularly published by scientific organizations and academic institutions, botanical illustrations became common requirements for popular usability and referential quality of these texts. New printing processes in the 18th century and on allowed artists such as Franz and Ferdinand Bauer to depict minute aspects and render more accurate color portrayals of subjects. Widening interest in natural history and horticulture stimulated production of many floras and other publications on natural sciences. Amateur botanists, gardeners, and natural historians provided a market for botanical publications and illustrations increased the appeal and accessibility of these to the general reader. Exploded details accompanied text and highlighted specific features of subjects described, allowing lay-audiences to more easily identify species.

Botanical illustration is a feature of many notable books on plants, of which a few include Vienna Dioscurides, Flora Graeca, The Banksias, and The Cactaceae. Curtis's Botanical Magazine (1787), a 230-year-old magazine long-associated with the Linnaean Society and Kew Gardens, is now primarily one of finer botanical illustration.

Field guides, floras, catalogues and magazines produced since the introduction of photography to print material have continued to include illustrations.  A compromise of accuracy and idealized images from several specimens can be easily (re)produced by skilled artists. Illustrations are also at times just preferred for some print/digital audiences or text formats.

The contributions of botanical illustrators continue to be praised and sought and very fine examples continue to be produced. In the 1980s, Celia Rosser undertook to illustrate every Banksia species for the masterwork, The Banksias. When another species was described after its publication, Banksia rosserae, it was named to honour her mammoth accomplishment. Other illustrators, such as the prolific Matilda Smith, have been specifically honoured for this work. In 1972, the Smithsonian Institution hired its first botanical illustrator, Alice Tangerini.

Recently, a renaissance has been occurring in botanical art and illustration. Organizations devoted to furthering the art form are found in the US (American Society of Botanical Artists), UK (Society of Botanical Artists), Australia (Botanical Art Society of Australia), and South Africa (Botanical Artists Association of South Africa), among others. There is an increasing interest in the changes occurring in the natural world and in the central role plants play in maintaining healthy ecosystems. A sense of urgency has developed in documenting today's plant life for future generations. Original botanical illustrations rendered in traditional media (with which art conservators are more familiar) can and might serve as reference research materials for endangered species.

Notable botanical illustrators
Notable botanical illustrators include:

James Andrews
George French Angas
Claude Aubriet
Alois Auer
Françoise Basseporte
Ferdinand Bauer
Franz Bauer
Elizabeth Blackwell
Harry Bolus
Priscilla Susan Bury
Olivia Marie Braida-Chiusano
Mark Catesby
Lise Cloquet
Gillian Condy
Léon Camille Marius Croizat
Dioscorides
Catharina Helena Dörrien
Atanasio Echeverria y Godoy
Sydenham Edwards
Georg Dionysius Ehret
James Henry Emerton
Barbara Everard
Walter Hood Fitch
Barbara Jeppe
Martha King
Jacques le Moyne
Dorothy van Dyke Leake
Cythna Letty
Carl Axel Magnus Lindman
Margaret Mee
Maria Sibylla Merian
Philippa Nikulinsky
Marianne North
Pierre-Joseph Redouté
Sarah Rhodes
Lewis Roberts
Celia Rosser
Ellis Rowan
Vera Scarth-Johnson
Dorothea Eliza Smith
Matilda Smith
Lilian Snelling
Gerard van Spaendonck
James Sowerby
Sydney Parkinson
Alice Tangerini
Frances Elizabeth Tripp
Elizabeth Twining
Pierre Jean François Turpin
Ellaphie Ward-Hilhorst

Awards
The Linnean Society of London awards the Jill Smythies Award for botanical illustration.

See also
Florilegium
Still life
List of florilegia and botanical codices
List of American botanical illustrators
List of Australian botanical illustrators
List of Irish botanical illustrators
Illustration
Stuttgart Database of Scientific Illustrators

References

Further reading
 De Bray, Lys (2001). The Art of Botanical Illustration: A history of classic illustrators and their achievements. Quantum Publishing, London. .
 Blunt, Wilfrid and Stearn, William T. (1994). The Art of Botanical Illustration. Antique Collector's Club, London. .
 Morris, Colleen; Louisa Murray: (2016). The Florilegium: the Royal Botanic Gardens Sydney celebrating 200 years: plants of the three gardens of the Royal Botanic Gardens and Domain Trust, The Florilegium Society at the Royal Botanic Gardens, Sydney. 
 Sherwood, Shirley (2001). A Passion for Plants: Contemporary Botanical Masterworks. Cassell and Co, London. .
 Sherwood, Shirley and Rix, Martyn (2008). Treasures of Botanical Art. Royal Botanic Gardens, Kew. .

External links

 American Society of Botanical Artists
Art Serving Science: Solutions for the Preservation and Access of a Collection of Botanical Art and Illustration
Botanical Art Society of Australia
Botanical Drawings of carnivorous plants from the John Innes Centre Historical Collection
Plantillustrations.org: searchable database of historic illustrations
Botany.si.edu: online Smithsonian catalogue
Flora of New Granada (Colombia) Drawings online, from the  Royal Botanical Expedition led by Jose Celestino Mutis 
Traveling Artist Wildflowers Project
University of Delaware: 'The Art of Botanical Illustration' exhibit

 01
.
Illustration
Botany